Fromont jeune et Risler aîné (1874; English: Fromont Junior and Risler Senior or Fromont and Risler or Sidonie) is a novel by French author Alphonse Daudet. It is the novel that first made Daudet famous, or as he put it, "the dawn of his popularity."

History

Fromont and Risler is the novel that first made Daudet famous. He had won a creditable literary place for himself before its publication with Letters From My Windmill (1869), but when Fromont and Risler appeared in 1874, he was at once hailed as one of the few really great novelists of his time, one of the few who knew how to deal adequately with the mysteries, the complexities, and the subtleties of human nature and human passion. It was everywhere read and talked of, from the highest to the lowest ranks. Numberless editions of the book were printed — deluxe editions, library editions, and editions so cheap that the gamins of the streets might buy and read; and demands poured in for the privilege of translation rights in other countries.

Notes

External links
Fromont and Risler at Internet Archive (scanned books original editions color illustrated)

1874 French novels
Works by Alphonse Daudet
French novels adapted into films